The 1st Army Corps was a formation in the Imperial Russian Army, formed in the 1870s. It took part in the Russo-Turkish War of 1877–78, and later, in August 1914, the 1st Army Corps fought as part of the Second Army in the Battle of Tannenberg. There, it was defeated by the Germans along with the rest of the Second Army. During the rest of World War I, it took part in other operations, up until around 1918.

Composition 
The following is a list of units that made up the 1st Army Corps at different points during its existence:

1874:
1st Cavalry Division

1903:
22nd Infantry Division
37th Infantry Division
50th Reserve Infantry Brigade

1913:

22nd Infantry Division
37th Infantry Division
1st Mortar Artillery Division
1st Saper Battalion
7th Pontoon Battalion

1914:

22nd Infantry Division
1st Brigade
85th "Vyborksky" Infantry Regiment
86th "Vilmanstranski" Infantry Regiment
2nd Brigade
87th "Neishlotski" Infantry Regiment
88th "Petrovski" Infantry Regiment
22nd Artillery Brigade
24th Infantry Division
1st Brigade
93rd "Irkutski" Infantry Regiment
94th 'Eniceiski" Infantry Regiment
2nd Brigade
95th "Krasnoyarski" Infantry Regiment
96th "Omski" Infantry Regiment
24th Artillery Brigade

Commanders 
Officers that commanded the corps during its existence:

See also 
 List of Imperial Russian Army formations and units

Sources

Notes 

Corps of the Russian Empire
Military units and formations established in 1877
Military units and formations disestablished in 1918
1877 establishments in the Russian Empire